Al-Mazra'a al-Qibliya was a Palestinian village in the Ramallah and al-Bireh Governorate. 

In 2005 it merged with  the village of Abu Shukheidim  to form the town of Al-Zaitounah.

History
Pottery sherds from the Byzantine era have been found here.

Ottoman era
The village was incorporated into the Ottoman Empire in 1517 with all of Palestine, and in 1596 it appeared in the Ottoman tax registers as Qibliyya, being in the nahiya (subdistrict) of Quds, part of the liwa (district) of Quds. It had a population of 8 households, all Muslims. The villagers paid a fixed tax rate of 33.3% on various agricultural products, including wheat, barley, summer crops, olive trees, goats and/or beehives, in addition to "occasional revenues"; a total of 2,190 akçe. Pottery sherds from the early Ottoman era have also been found here.

In 1838, it was noted as a Muslim village, el-Mezra'ah, in the Bani Harith district, north of Jerusalem.

An Ottoman village list of about 1870 showed that Mezra'a  had 111 houses and a population of 428, though the population count included men, only.

In 1882, the PEF's Survey of Western Palestine described Mezeirat el Kibliyeh as: "a good sized village on low ground, among olives".

In 1896 the population of  'Mezraa in Bani Harit was estimated to be about 1,569 persons.

British Mandate
In the 1922 census of Palestine, conducted by the British Mandate of Palestine, there were 492 people living in Al Mizra'a al-Qibliyeh, all  Muslims, rising to 799 Muslims in the 1931 census, in a total of 162 houses. 

In   1945 statistics  the population was 860, all Muslims,  while the total land area was 13,240  dunams, according to an official land and population survey. Of  this,  6,483  were  plantations and irrigable land, 1,847  for cereals, while 34 dunams were classified as built-up areas.

Jordanian era
In the wake of the 1948 Arab–Israeli War, and after the 1949 Armistice Agreements, Al-Mazra'a al-Qibliya  came  under Jordanian rule.

The Jordanian census of 1961 found 1,349 inhabitants.

Post-1967
Since the Six-Day War in 1967,  Al-Mazra'a al-Qibliya  has been under Israeli occupation. 

After the 1995 accords, 54.2% of Al-Zaitounah land was defined as Area B, while the remaining 45.8% was defined as Area C. Israel has confiscated 308 dunams of land from Al-Zaitounah in order to construct two Israeli settlements, Talmon and Nahl'iel.

Israeli settlers have started  encroaching on  Al-Mazra'a al-Qibliya land, especially the hilltop named Khirbet Na’alan. In  October 15, 2018,  the settlers  entered the village in the night and damaged 28 cars, drawing Stars of David on them and writing “Death to the Arabs.” On October 26, 2018, in an altercation between villagers and Israeli settlers, the Israel Border Police, without warning, started shooting the Palestinian villagers. 9 Palestinians were wounded, 2 were killed; Uthman Labawda, 33 years old and the father of 4, and Mohammed Ibrahim Shreitah, the father of 2.

References

Bibliography

External links
Welcome to al-Mazra'a al-Qibliya
 Mazra’a Qibliyeh, palestine-family.net
Survey of Western Palestine, Map 14:  IAA, Wikimedia commons 
 AL-Zaytouneh town (fact sheet),   Applied Research Institute–Jerusalem (ARIJ)
 AL-Zaytouneh town profile, (ARIJ)
AL-Zaytouneh  aerial photo, (ARIJ)
Locality Development Priorities and Needs in AL- Zaytouneh Town, (ARIJ)

Towns in the West Bank
Municipalities of the State of Palestine